"I Wanna Be a Warhol" is a song by the Chicago-based punk rock band Alkaline Trio, released as the first single from their 2013 album My Shame Is True on February 5, 2013. A music video for the song was released on March 8, 2013, and it features the actress Milla Jovovich. The song impacted radio on March 12, 2013.

Track listing

Personnel

Band
Matt Skiba – guitar, lead vocals
Dan Andriano – bass, backing vocals
Derek Grant – drums

References 

Alkaline Trio songs
2013 songs
Songs written by Matt Skiba
Songs written by Dan Andriano
Songs written by Derek Grant (drummer)
Epitaph Records singles
2013 singles